Carlos Alberto Barrena Fabián (born April 24, 1982) is a Peruvian footballer who plays as an attacking midfielder who plays for Los Caimanes.

Club career
Barrena joined Colegio Nacional Iquitos in July 2008, which at the time was competing in the Copa Perú division.
He made his debut for Colegio Nacional Iquitos in the 2008 Copa Perú season and scored his first goal for them in a 2-2 draw against Cobresol FBC for the final group stage of the competition. At the end of the 2008 Copa Perú season he helped his hometown club win promotion to the Peruvian First Division.

Barrena made his Peruvian First Division debut with Colegio Nacional Iquitos colors on February 14, 2009 in Round 1 of the 2009 Descentralizado season against Sporting Cristal. Barrena played the entire match and helped his club earn a point at home against the runners-up of the previous season.

References

External links

1982 births
Living people
People from Iquitos
Association football wingers
Peruvian footballers
Olímpico Somos Perú footballers
Sport Áncash footballers
Colegio Nacional Iquitos footballers
José Gálvez FBC footballers
Real Garcilaso footballers
Comerciantes Unidos footballers
Deportivo Coopsol players
Sport Loreto players
Los Caimanes footballers
Copa Perú players
Peruvian Primera División players
Peruvian Segunda División players